Quercus frutex is a species of plant in the family Fagaceae. It is endemic to central Mexico, found in México State, D.F., Tlaxcala, Hidalgo, Jalisco, Puebla, and Oaxaca. It is placed in Quercus section Quercus.

The bark is dark gray. The leaves are oblong, with no teeth or with a few shallow teeth.

References

frutex
Endemic oaks of Mexico
Plants described in 1924
Taxa named by William Trelease